The 4.5-Inch Beach Barrage Rocket, also known as "Old Faithful", was a  rocket developed and used by the United States Navy during World War II. Originally developed from the "Mousetrap" anti-submarine rocket, it saw widespread use during the war, being replaced by more powerful rockets toward the end of the conflict.

Development
Developed during 1942 by the California Institute of Technology (Caltech), under the direction of Charles Christian Lauritsen, in response to a requirement by the United States Navy for a rocket capable of being launched from landing craft to provide fire support during amphibious landings, the 4.5-Inch BBR was an improved version of the Mousetrap anti-submarine rocket system, using the Mousetrap's Mk 3 rocket motor mated to a  general purpose aerial bomb. An impact fuse was mounted in the nose of the rocket, with an annular fin assembly providing stability. A modified, larger version of the Beach Barrage Rocket, using the Mk 9 rocket motor, was also produced, being introduced into service in late 1944.

Operational history
First test fired on June 24, 1942, further tests in August proved sufficiently successful for the Navy Bureau of Ordnance to place an initial order for 3,000 Beach Barrage Rockets; the weapon was introduced into combat service that November, during the invasion of northern Africa. Fired from 12-round launchers and capable of being fitted with either the standard high explosive or a white phosphorus warhead, approximately 1,600,000 examples of the BBR were built; although the rocket proved inaccurate in service, it was widely used, and was highly regarded by members of the amphibious forces. The effect on the target of the Beach Barrage Rocket was described as being equivalent to that of a barrage from heavy mortars.

The 4.5-Inch BBR also saw use as an improvised ship-to-ship weapon, as well as being launched from ground-based launchers; it is credited with the first ship to be sunk by another purely by rocket attack, occurring near Ormoc in December 1944. Toward the end of the war, the Beach Barrage Rocket was replaced in service by the  High Velocity Spinner Rocket.

References

Citations

Bibliography

Fowler, William A. (1975). "Charles Christian Lauritsen", in Biographical Memoirs. National Academy of Sciences. .

Rocket weapons of the United States
World War II weapons of the United States
California Institute of Technology
Weapons and ammunition introduced in 1942